Abselema of Edessa is recorded as having been a disciple of Saint Addai and a bishop of Edessa, who lived in 2-d century. His feast day is celebrated on October 19.

See also
 List of early Christian saints

References

Sources
Holweck, F. G. A Biographical Dictionary of the Saints. St. Louis, MO: B. Herder Book Co. 1924.

Year of birth missing
Year of death missing
Bishops of Edessa
2nd-century Christian saints